Ujiarpur Assembly constituency is an assembly constituency in Samastipur district in the Indian state of Bihar. The constituency was formed following the Delimitation Order of 2008.

Overview
As per Delimitation of Parliamentary and Assembly constituencies Order, 2008, No. 134 Ujiarpur Assembly constituency is composed of the following: Ujiarpur community development block; Sultanpur Ghataho,
Chakbahauddin, Mokhtiyarpur Salkhani, Panr, Harishankarpur, Kewanta, Nagargama, Pagra, Nawada, Basariya gram panchayats and Dalsinghsarai notified area of Dalsinghsarai CD Block.

Ujiarpur Assembly constituency is part of No. 22 Ujiarpur (Lok Sabha constituency).

Members of Legislative Assembly

Election results

2020

2015
In the 2015 state assembly elections, Alok Kumar Mehta of RJD won the newly constituted Ujiarpur seat.

References

External links
 

Assembly constituencies of Bihar
Politics of Samastipur district
Samastipur